"Homecoming '63" is a song written by Dean Dillon and Royce Porter, and recorded by American country music artist Keith Whitley.  It was released in November 1986 as the fourth single from the album L.A. to Miami.  The song reached number 9 on the Billboard Hot Country Singles & Tracks chart.

Chart performance
"Homecoming '63" debuted at number 61 on the U.S. Billboard Hot Country Singles & Tracks for the week of November 8, 1986.

References

1986 singles
1986 songs
Keith Whitley songs
Songs written by Dean Dillon
Songs written by Royce Porter
RCA Records singles